Farzana Marie (born ) is the pen name of Felisa Hervey, an American poet, author and former United States Air Force officer.

Early life 
Hervey was born in California to Episcopal Church missionary parents, Debbie and John Hervey. Felisa and her five siblings lived with their parents in Chile and Kazakhstan before returning to their native California when she was 15.

Work 
Hervey joined the United States Air Force Academy in June 2001. Before graduating, she travelled to Afghanistan in 2003 and 2004 to work in an orphanage and learn Dari. After graduation and joining the US Air Force, she spent two years working in Kabul where her fluency in Dari enabled community relations work. 

She received a Bronze Star Medal in 2012, the same year her six-year deployment to Afghanistan ended. After her military career, Hervey returned to Kabul to study and later to work for NATO. She worked as an editor and translator, using the pen name Farzana Marie.

Hervey studied for a PhD in Persian literature at the University of Arizona, funded by a Pat Tillman Foundation scholarship. In August 2015, before her PhD was complete, she suffered a stroke in Afghanistan. Aphasia caused her to lose all six languages that she spoke. In May 2019, she graduated her Ph.D in Middle Eastern literature.

Personal life 
Hervey was aged 30 in 2014, and is Christian.

She lives in Tucson.

Selected books 

 Load Poems Like Guns: Women’s Poetry from Herat, Afghanistan, Holy Cow! Press (editor and translator)
 Letters to War and Lethe (author)
 Hearts for Sale! A Buyer’s Guide to Winning in Afghanistan, Worldwide Writings 2013, (author)

References 

1980s births
American emigrants to Chile
American missionaries
United States Air Force Academy alumni
Female officers of the United States Air Force
American women poets
21st-century American women writers
University of Arizona alumni
Writers from Tucson, Arizona
Living people